Bruce Hornbrook Sage was a chemical engineer who taught Chemical Engineering at the California Institute of Technology from 1931 to 1974.

Early career
Sage received his bachelor's degree at New Mexico State College in 1929 and his Master of Science degree in 1931 and Doctor of Philosophy degree in 1934 at Caltech, all in chemical engineering. He worked on the design of tactical missiles at Eaton Canyon during World War II before joining the Naval Ordnance Test Station near Inyokern, California, as associate director of engineering and head of the explosives department in 1945. In 1950, he was named senior consultant to the technical director there. He also served as a technical advisor to Aerojet General from 1950 to 1969.

Honors
In 1948, Sage, along with Lee A. DuBridge, William A. Fowler, Max Mason, and Linus Pauling, was awarded the Medal for Merit by President Harry S. Truman.

On  in New York City, the American Rocket Society presented Sage with their Clarence N. Hickman Award for his work with propellants in jet propulsion. At the invitation of the Academy of Sciences of the Soviet Union, Sage visited Russia for two weeks in the summer of 1958 to discuss differences in the field of steam research. In 1959, he received the William H. Walker Award for Excellence in Contributions to Chemical Engineering Literature from the American Institute of Chemical Engineers. In 1968, the Union Oil Company of California donated  to Caltech for two chemical engineering fellowships: one to be named for Bruce Sage, the other for his long-time collaborator, William N. Lacey.

Works

References 

1909 births
1983 deaths
20th-century American chemists
20th-century American engineers
American chemical engineers
California Institute of Technology alumni
Medal for Merit recipients
Members of the American Chemical Society
Members of the American Institute of Chemical Engineers
Members of the American Rocket Society
Members of the Society of Petroleum Engineers
New Mexico State University alumni
Rocket scientists